Döwletli District is a district of Lebap Province in Turkmenistan. Its administrative center is the town of Döwletli.

References

Districts of Turkmenistan
Lebap Region